Kingsnordley is a manor in the northern part of the parish of Alveley.

This part of the parish has no nucleated village, but there is a Church of England chapel of ease at Tuckhill.

See also
Listed buildings in Alveley

Villages in Shropshire